Jeffrey Yishai is a former Israeli footballer.

References

1978 births
Israeli Jews
Living people
Israeli footballers
Maccabi Tel Aviv F.C. players
Maccabi Netanya F.C. players
Bnei Yehuda Tel Aviv F.C. players
Liga Leumit players
Israeli Premier League players
Association football central defenders